Gerald Melzer was the defending champion but lost in the first round to Federico Coria.

Guido Andreozzi won the title after defeating Pedro Sousa 7–5, 1–6, 6–4 in the final.

Seeds

Draw

Finals

Top half

Bottom half

References
Main Draw
Qualifying Draw

Challenger Ciudad de Guayaquil - Singles
2018 Singles